Muhammad Putra Erwiansyah (born 15 February 2004) is an Indonesian badminton player affiliated with Djarum club. He was a silver medalist in the boys' doubles and a bronze medalist in the mixed team event at the 2022 World Junior Championships.

Achievements

World Junior Championships 
Boys' doubles

BWF International Challenge/Series (1 title, 3 runners-up) 
Men's doubles

Mixed doubles

  BWF International Challenge tournament
  BWF International Series tournament
  BWF Future Series tournament

BWF Junior International (2 titles, 1 runners-up) 
Boys' doubles

Mixed doubles

  BWF Junior International Grand Prix tournament
  BWF Junior International Challenge tournament
  BWF Junior International Series tournament
  BWF Junior Future Series tournament

Performance timeline

National team 
 Junior level

Individual competitions

Junior level 
 Boys' doubles

Senior level 
 Men's doubles

References

External links 
 

2004 births
Living people
Sportspeople from Makassar
Indonesian male badminton players
21st-century Indonesian people